William Glenn Killinger (September 13, 1898July 25, 1988) was an American football, basketball, and baseball player, coach, and college athletics administrator from Harrisburg, Pennsylvania. He graduated Harrisburg Technical High School and then lettered in three sports at Pennsylvania State University, where he was an All-American in football in 1921.  Killinger then played in the National Football League (NFL) for the Canton Bulldogs and the New York Giants and for Philadelphia Quakers of the first American Football League in 1926.  Killinger served as the head football coach at Dickinson College (1922), Rensselaer Polytechnic Institute (1927–1931), Moravian College (1933), West Chester University (1934–1941, 1945–1959), and with the North Carolina Pre-Flight School (1944), compiling a career college football record of 176–72–16.  He was inducted to the College Football Hall of Fame as a player in 1971.

Killinger was also a minor league baseball player from 1922 until 1932. During that time, he played for the Jersey City Skeeters (1922), Atlanta Crackers (1923), Harrisburg Senators (1924, 1927–1928), Shamokin Indians (1926) and the Williamsport Grays (1929–1932). He served as a manager for the Indians and the Senators, managing the latter to the Eastern League pennant in 1928.

Further reading
Mealy, Todd M. (2018). Glenn Killinger, All-American: Penn State's World War I Era Sports Hero. (Jefferson, NC: McFarland & Co.)  Retrieved April 22, 2018

References

External links
 
 
 
 
 

1898 births
1988 deaths
All-American college football players
American football halfbacks
American football quarterbacks
American men's basketball players
United States Navy personnel of World War II
Atlanta Crackers players
Canton Bulldogs players
Cincinnati Reds scouts
College Football Hall of Fame inductees
Dickinson Red Devils football coaches
Harrisburg Senators players
Jersey City Skeeters players
Moravian Greyhounds baseball coaches
Moravian Greyhounds football coaches
New York Giants players
North Carolina Pre-Flight Cloudbusters football coaches
Penn State Nittany Lions athletic directors
Penn State Nittany Lions baseball players
Penn State Nittany Lions football coaches
Penn State Nittany Lions football players
Penn State Nittany Lions basketball players
Philadelphia Quakers (AFL) players
Baseball players from Harrisburg, Pennsylvania
Basketball players from Harrisburg, Pennsylvania
Players of American football from Harrisburg, Pennsylvania
RPI Engineers football coaches
Shamokin Indians players
Sportspeople from Harrisburg, Pennsylvania
United States Navy officers
West Chester Golden Rams athletic directors
West Chester Golden Rams baseball coaches
West Chester Golden Rams football coaches
West Chester Golden Rams men's basketball coaches
Williamsport Grays players
Military personnel from Pennsylvania